Erymanthus or Erymanthos may refer to:

Geography
 Erymanthos (municipality), a municipality of Achaea in the Peloponnese of Greece
 Erymanthos (river), a river in the Peloponnese
 Mount Erymanthos, a mountain range in Achaea and Elis, Peloponnese, Greece
 Erymanthus, an ancient Greek city of Arcadia later known as Psophis

Mythology
 Erymanthian Boar, a beast hunted by Heracles
 Erymanthus (mythology), name of several mythological figures

Biology
 Erymanthus (beetle), a checkered beetle genus in the subfamily Clerinae